Papi Khaldar-e Sofla (also Romanized as Pāpī Khāldār-e Soflá) is a village in Robat Rural District, in the Central District of Khorramabad County, Lorestan Province, Iran. At the 2006 census, its population was 230, in 44 families.

References 

Towns and villages in Khorramabad County